NGC 428 is a barred spiral galaxy in the constellation of Cetus (The Sea Monster), with its spiral structure distorted and warped, possibly the result of the collision of two galaxies. There appears to be a substantial amount of star formation occurring within NGC 428 and it lacks well defined arms — a telltale sign of a galaxy merger. In 2015 the Hubble Space Telescope made a close-up shot of the galaxy with its Advanced Camera for Surveys and its Wide Field and Planetary Camera 2. The structure of NGC 428 has been compared to NGC 5645.

Discoveries

NGC 428 was discovered by William Herschel in December 1786. A type Ia supernova designated SN2013ct was discovered May 11, 2013, within the galaxy by Stuart Parker of the Backyard Observatory Supernova Search (BOSS) project in Australia and New Zealand.

Smoker et al.  reported in 1996 on the NGC 428 field, with the HI tail and LSB dwarf 0110+008, assessing star formation properties based on molecule density distributions, and concluded that the tail formation most likely originated through tidal interactions between two galaxies.

Further reading
H-alpha kinematics of S4G spiral galaxies-II. Data description and non-circular motions
Comparative internal kinematics of the HII regions in interacting and isolated galaxies: implications for massive star formation modes
A classical morphological analysis of galaxies in the spitzer survey of stellar structure in galaxies (S4G)
Kinematics of disk galaxies with known masses of their supermassive black holes. Observations Cherepashchuk, A.; Afanas’ev, V.; Zasov, A.; and Katkov, I. Astronomy Reports, 2010, Vol.54(7), pp. 578–589.

See also
Galaxy merger
List of galaxies

References

External links

The galaxy NGC 428 (Location dependent info when to observe the galaxy in the sky)
Supernovae 2013ct in NGC 428
NASA/IPAC Extragalactic Database
Images of NGC 428

Galaxies discovered in 1786
0428
Cetus (constellation)
Barred spiral galaxies
004367